Batman, a fictional superhero appearing in publications by DC Comics, has appeared in numerous filmed works, with a variety of casts. The list below presents the casts of the television series in which Batman was the eponymous starring character.

Live-action

Animated

References

Television cast
Batman television series
Lists of actors by crime television series
Lists of actors by science fiction television series
Lists of DC Comics television characters
Lists of DC Comics animated television characters
Lists of actors by superhero television series